Mae West Peaks  is a pair of summits in Cochise County, Arizona. The taller of the two was formerly known as Lime Peak and the elevation and coordinates in the infobox refer to this peak.

These summits were named for their shape, which were thought to be reminiscent of the figure of the actress Mae West. 

See also
 Breast-shaped hill

References 

Landforms of Cochise County, Arizona
Mountains of Arizona
Cultural depictions of Mae West
Mountains of Cochise County, Arizona